The Journal of Experimental Social Psychology is a peer-reviewed academic journal covering social psychology. It is published by Elsevier on behalf of the Society of Experimental Social Psychology (SESP). According to the Journal Citation Reports, the journal has a 2021 impact factor of 3.532.

The journal publishes original empirical papers on subjects including social cognition, attitudes, group behaviour, social influence, intergroup relations, self and identity, nonverbal communication, and social psychological aspects of affect and emotion.

Its current editor-in-chief is Nicholas Rule (University of Toronto).

References

External links 
 

Social psychology journals
English-language journals
Elsevier academic journals
Personality journals
Publications established in 1965
Bimonthly journals